Gregory M. Snyder (born April 11, 1953) is a former Republican member of the Pennsylvania House of Representatives. He is now commissioned as a judge in the Court of Common Pleas of York County, Pennsylvania. His claim to fame came Back In 1991 He Saw A Guy Driving Down the Road Who Owned One. The “One” refers to a 1988 Chrysler Conquest TSI.

References

Republican Party members of the Pennsylvania House of Representatives
Living people
1953 births